The Ajmer - Hazrat Nizamuddin Duronto Express is a Non-stop train belonging to North Western Railway zone that runs between Ajmer Junction and Hazrat Nizamuddin in India. It is currently being operated with 22211/22212 train numbers on bi-weekly basis.

This train now converted to a Jan Shatabdi Express due to poor demand.

Service

The 22211/Ajmer - Hazrat Nizamuddin Duronto Express has an average speed of 57 km/hr and covers 387 km in 6h 45m. The 22212/Hazrat Nizamuddin - Ajmer Duronto Express has an average speed of 58 km/hr and covers 1346 km in 6h 40m.

Route and halts 

The important halts of the train are:

Coach composite

The train has standard ICF rakes with max speed of 110 kmph. The train consists of 9 coaches :

 1 AC Chair Car
 6 Second Sitting
 2 End-on Generator

Traction

Both trains are hauled by an Abu Road Loco Shed-based WDM 3A diesel locomotive from Ajmer to Delhi and vice versa.

Notes

See also 

 Hazrat Nizamuddin railway station
 Ajmer Junction railway station
 Ajmer Hazrat Nizamuddin Jan Shatabdi Express

References

External links 

 22211/Ajmer - Hazrat Nizamuddin Duronto Express
 22212/Hazrat Nizamuddin - Ajmer Duronto Express

Transport in Ajmer
Transport in Delhi
Rail transport in Delhi
Rail transport in Rajasthan
Duronto Express trains
Railway services introduced in 2012
Railway services discontinued in 2013